According to Muslim traditional lore, the First Raid on Banu Thalabah took place in August, 627AD in 4th month of, 6AH of the Islamic Calendar, under the leadership of Muhammad ibn Maslamah

Background
Muhammad sent a large herd of camels out to graze in the vicinity of Hayfa, a place seven miles from Medina which was lush with green pastures. Due to the continuous drought, Banu Thalabah, a section of the Ghatafan tribe, was tempted to steal from Muhammad's herd.

He suspected mischievousness from these people and sent his trusted lieutenant, Muhammad ibn Maslama with 10 followers to raid the vicinity of Dhu al-Qassah of Banu Thalabah.

Ambush
The Banu Thalabah tribe were already aware of the impending attack; so they lay in wait for the Muslims, and when Muhammad ibn Maslama arrived at the site. The Banu Thalabah, with 100 men ambushed them, while the Muslims were making preparation to sleep; and after a brief resistance killed all of Muhammad ibn Maslama's men. Muhammad ibn Maslama pretended to be dead. A Muslim who happened to pass that way found him and assisted him to return to Medina. The raid was unsuccessful.

See also
 Military career of Muhammad
 List of expeditions of Muhammad
 Second Raid on Banu Thalabah

Notes

627
Campaigns ordered by Muhammad